FASTT may stand for:

 FAStT Series, an IBM Storage product line
 Freeflight Atmospheric Scramjet Test Technique, used in Scramjet programs
 Flagstaff Astrometric Scanning Transit Telescope, a Meridian circle